Mwanga, or Namwanga (Nyamwanga), is a Bantu language spoken by the Mwanga people in the Northern Province of Zambia (mainly in the districts of Isoka and Nakonde) and in Mbeya Region, Tanzania. The 2010 Zambian census found 140,000 speakers. The current number in Tanzania is unknown; Ethnologue cites a figure from 1987 of 87,000.

There are also some speakers of Namwanga in the north-west part of Chitipa District in northern Malawi.

The Namwanga language is similar to the Mambwe language spoken by the Mambwe people of Mbala and Mpulungu districts and the Lungu people also found in Isoka. Other similar smaller peoples include the Lambyas, the Nyikas and the Wandyas.

Alphabet 
Nyamwanga has 5 vowels and 17 consonants, a total of 22 letters

Vowels: A E I O U

Consonants: B D F G J K L M N P S SH T V W Y Z

Sample text 
Amulandu ci wuno Yesu atalesizye umuntu wino wafumyanga iviwa mwi zina lyakwe nanti aca kuti atalinji pa wasambilizi wakwe?
 Why did Jesus not prevent a man from expelling demons, even though the man was not following him?

See also 
 Languages of Zambia

References

Rukwa languages
Languages of Tanzania
Languages of Zambia
Languages of Malawi